Abdulaziz Al-Shahrani (born 30 October 1994) is a Saudi Arabian professional footballer who plays as an attacking midfielder for Damac.

Career 
Al-Shahrani plays mostly as an attacking midfielder, but can also be deployed as a winger. He began his senior career as a member of his hometown club Abha in the Saudi Second Division, departing two seasons later to join local rivals and Saudi First Division club Damac. He made his debut for the first team on 13 September 2017 in the league match against Al-Nahda coming off the bench in the 53rd minute. He scored his first goal for the club in the same match, scoring the equalizer in the 55th minute. On 22 January 2018, Al-Shahrani ruptured his ACL was ruled out for the remainder of the 2017–18 season. He ended his first season at the club making 14 appearances and scoring 3 goals. He made his return to the first team in the first match of the 2018–19 season against his former club Abha. In his second season at the club, Al-Shahrani made 18 appearances and scored 3 goals before leaving the club mid-season. 

On 22 January 2019, Al-Shahrani signed a 4-year contract with Pro League club Al-Ahli. After making no appearances for Al-Ahli, Al-Shahrani rejoined Damac on loan until the end of the 2019–20 season. On 23 October 2020, Al-Shahrani joined Damac on a permanent deal. On 27 January 2022, Al-Shahrani joined Ohod on loan until the end of the 2021–22 season.

References

External links
 

1994 births
Living people
People from Abha
Association football midfielders
Saudi Arabian footballers
Saudi Second Division players
Saudi First Division League players
Saudi Professional League players
Abha Club players
Damac FC players
Ohod Club players
Al-Ahli Saudi FC players